Exequiel Emanuel Benavídez  (born 5 March 1989, in Santiago del Estero, Argentina), is an Argentine footballer who plays as a defensive midfielder for Chacarita Juniors.

Career
Exequiel was signed in 2008 from the Youth Divisions of Boca Juniors and debuted in a 3–1 win against Arsenal.

In 2009, he was selected for the Argentina Sub-20 team to participate in the 2009 South American Youth Championship, the qualification tournament for the 2009 FIFA U-20 World Cup, where Argentina missed out on qualification for the World Cup by finishing bottom of their group in the second round of the competition.

External links
 Argentine Primera statistics at Fútbol XXI  
 Benavídez, Exequiel Emanuel at Historia de Boca.com 
 

1989 births
Living people
Argentine footballers
Argentina under-20 international footballers
Argentine expatriate footballers
Association football midfielders
Boca Juniors footballers
All Boys footballers
Deportes Iquique footballers
Nueva Chicago footballers
L.D.U. Quito footballers
Sud América players
Club Atlético Mitre footballers
Patriotas Boyacá footballers
L.D.U. Portoviejo footballers
Chacarita Juniors footballers
Argentine Primera División players
Chilean Primera División players
Ascenso MX players
Ecuadorian Serie A players
Categoría Primera A players
Uruguayan Primera División players
Expatriate footballers in Chile
Expatriate footballers in Ecuador
Expatriate footballers in Uruguay
Expatriate footballers in Mexico
Expatriate footballers in Colombia
Argentine expatriate sportspeople in Chile
Argentine expatriate sportspeople in Ecuador
Argentine expatriate sportspeople in Uruguay
Argentine expatriate sportspeople in Mexico
Argentine expatriate sportspeople in Colombia
People from Santiago del Estero
Sportspeople from Santiago del Estero Province